Jalain Tappeh (also Romanized as Jalā'īn Tappeh) is a village in Fajr Rural District, in the Central District of Gonbad-e Qabus County, Golestan Province, Iran. At the 2006 census, its population was 132, in 26 families.

References 

Populated places in Gonbad-e Kavus County